Vasily Andreevich Tropinin (– ) was a Russian Romantic painter. Much of his life was spent as a serf; he didn't attain his freedom until he was more than forty years old.  Three of his more important works are a portrait of Alexander Pushkin and paintings called The Lace Maker and The Gold-Embroideress.

Biography

Vasily was born as a serf of Count Munnich in the village Korpovo of Novgorod guberniya. He was transferred to Count Morkov as part of the dowry of Munnich's daughter. Soon he was sent to Saint Petersburg to study the trade of a confectioner. Instead of learning his trade Tropinin secretly attended free drawing lessons in the Imperial Academy of Arts.

In 1799, his owner allowed Tropinin's to study at the Academy as a non-degree student (Postoronny uchenik). He took lessons from S. S. Schukin and was supported by the President of the Academy Alexander Sergeyevich Stroganov. In 1804 Tropinin's work Boy Grieving for a Dead Bird was exhibited in the Academy's exhibition and was noted by the Russian Empress at the time (most probably the Dowager Empress Maria Feodorovna).

At the dawn of his success, Count Morkov recalled Tropinin from St. Petersburg to his Ukrainian estate Kukavka. Tropinin was appointed a confectioner and a lackey. Soon the owner changed his mind and assigned Tropinin to copy the works of European and Russian painters and produce portraits of the Morkovs. Tropinin also painted the local church. Tropinin spent around twenty years of his life in Ukraine, and many of his works from that time were of Ukrainian people and the Ukrainian country side.

Still Tropinin continued to work and study. As a well-established portraitist, he wrote:

The most notable works of that period are Portrait of A. I. Tropinina, the Artist's Wife (1809), Portrait of Arseny Tropinin, son of the artist (c. 1818), Portrait of the Writer and Historian N. M. Karamzin (1818).

Academician
In 1823 at the age of 47 Tropinin at last became a free man and moved to Moscow. The same year he presented his paintings The Lace Maker, The Beggar and The Portrait of artist Skotnikov to the Imperial Academy of Arts and received the official certificate of a painter (Svobodnyj Khudozhnik). In 1824 he was elected an Academician.

Since 1833 he mastered the Moscow Public Art Classes that later became the famous Moscow School of Painting, Sculpture and Architecture. In 1843 he was elected an honorary member of the Moscow Art Society. He died in 1857 and was interred in Vagankovo Cemetery. During his life Tropinin painted more than 3,000 portraits.

In 1969 the Tropinin Museum was opened in Moscow.

Works

References

External links

Tropinin's gallery

1776 births
1857 deaths
People from Chudovsky District
18th-century painters from the Russian Empire
Russian male painters
19th-century painters from the Russian Empire
Russian romantic painters
Russian portrait painters
Russian serfs
Burials at Vagankovo Cemetery
19th-century male artists from the Russian Empire
Moscow School of Painting, Sculpture and Architecture alumni